Tara Harbert (born October 18, 1983) is a member of the United States women's national baseball team. Her father, Roger Harbert played professional baseball in Australia during the 1960s.

Playing career

Baseball
In preparation for the Team USA tryouts in 2008, she was coached by former Major Leaguer and Colorado Rockies coach Walt Weiss. She would serve as the leadoff hitter for Team USA at the 2008 and 2010 Women's Baseball World Cup.

With the New England Women's Red Sox, she was part of the team that captured the 2012 Roy Hobbes Cup.

She was announced as part of the roster for the Baseball at the 2015 Pan American Games, but was not in the final roster.

Softball
As a teenager, she played for the Colorado Stars, who were part of the American Softball Association Gold League. Harbert earned a scholarship to the University of Hawaii. In her junior season, she hit .423, and .486 in conference play, earning All-Conference and All-America honors.

Harbert transferred to Colorado State as a senior. She would steal 28 bases and earn All-Conference Team honors. In the summer of 2006, she was recruited to play softball in Europe by a team in Parma, Italy.

Awards and honors
 2010 Women's Baseball World Cup, Best Defensive Player

Personal
Her sister, Tanya, earned a gymnastics scholarship to Denver University.

References

1983 births
Living people
American female baseball players
Baseball players at the 2015 Pan American Games
Colorado State Rams softball players
Hawaii Rainbow Wahine softball players
Pan American Games competitors for the United States